Célony is a village close to Aix-en-Provence in France.

Overview
It is home to former gypsum quarries, bastides and farms, and a high school.

The Rue Célony in Aix-en-Provence is named for the village.

References

Villages in Provence-Alpes-Côte d'Azur